Berlingen may refer to the following places:

Berlingen, Switzerland, in the canton of Thurgau, Switzerland
Berlingen, Germany, in Rhineland-Palatinate, Germany